Dope Sick is the debut solo studio album by Canadian rapper Madchild. It was released on August 28, 2012 via Battle Axe/Suburban Noize Records. Production was handled by Aspect, C-Lance, Rob The Viking, Chin Injeti, Evidence, Matt Brevner and 2oolman. It features guest appearances from Bishop Lamont, D-Sisive, Dilated Peoples, Dutch Robinson, Matt Brevner, Phil da Agony, Prevail, Slaine, Sophia Danai and DJ Revolution. The album peaked at number three on the Canadian Albums Chart.

Track listing

Charts

References

External links

Madchild albums
2012 debut albums
Albums produced by Evidence (musician)